DC Retroactive is a line of one-shot comic book issues published by DC Comics. It revisited periods (grouped by decades) of the company's main characters: Batman, Superman, Wonder Woman, Green Lantern, the Justice League, and the Flash. These comics were published with cover dates of September and October 2011. The DC Retroactive comic books followed the Flashpoint event and were launched just before The New 52 line wherein DC titles were relaunched starting from #1.

Publication history
The one-shots featured different characters with a nostalgic version of their most representative decades. DC brought back some of the most relevant creative teams in the history of its main characters. Dennis O'Neil wrote Batman during the 1970s, as well as working with artist Mike Grell on the mid-1970s version of Green Lantern.

The Retroactive line also brought back writers and artists had not worked for DC for many years; some of whom had retired from comics, such as Rich Buckler, who drew one Wonder Woman story. Mike W. Barr, Cary Bates, Norm Breyfogle, Gerry Conway, Tom Mandrake, and Len Wein worked on the characters which they were associated with in the past.

Each comic book was published in a 46-page format, split between 26 pages of new content, plus 20 pages of reprinted tales.

Ben Abernathy, one of the editors of the project, stated: "It's the creators working on the characters that so many fans grew up reading. Readers have a real fondness and love for the material. And the opportunity to revisit that era, with the creators who made it great, is a welcome change from everything else going on in the industry these days". Abernathy also noted that "the mandate given was, basically, we wanted to tell a fun story that was set in the era, whether it be posed as a 'lost story', 'story they always wanted to tell' or maybe something connected to the reprint".

Titles

Collected editions
 Tales of the Batman: Len Wein includes Batman - The '70s, 640 pages, December 2014
 Justice League of America: The Detroit Era Omnibus includes Justice League - The '80s, 1,040 pages, December 2017

References

External links
DC Retroactive at Mike's Amazing World of Comics

2011 comics debuts
2011 comics endings
Comics by Alan Grant (writer)
Comics by Dennis O'Neil
Comics by Gerry Conway
Comics by J. M. DeMatteis
Comics by Keith Giffen
Comics by Len Wein
Comics by Louise Simonson
Comics by Marv Wolfman
Comics by Roy Thomas
DC Comics limited series
DC Comics one-shots
Defunct American comics
Lists of comics by DC Comics